The A152 is a small non-primary A-road in Lincolnshire, from Donington to Surfleet linking the A52 and the A16, two major primary routes.

Between Donington and Surfleet the road goes through three villages; Church End, Quadring, and Gosberton.

References

Roads in England
Roads in Lincolnshire